The Bridge (Concept of a Culture) is the seventh studio album by American hip hop recording artist Grandmaster Flash, his first studio album since 1998's Flash is Back. The album was released on February 24, 2009 under Strut Records. The album features guest appearances from rappers Q-Tip, Jumz, Afasi, Busta Rhymes, MC Supernatural, Snoop Dogg, Big Daddy Kane, Kase-O and Grandmaster Caz. The production was primarily handled by Grandmaster Flash himself.

Three different CD versions were released. These were the 'clean' and 'explicit content' standard 19 track editions, and a 'Bonus Edition'  (STRUT039CDX) featuring 2 exclusive remixes (*). A 2LP vinyl edition was also produced in the US.

Track listing

References

External links 
 The Bridge at Behind the Hype

2009 albums
Grandmaster Flash albums
Albums produced by Grandmaster Flash
East Coast hip hop albums